Tollwitz is a village and a former municipality in the district Saalekreis, in Saxony-Anhalt, Germany. Since 1 January 2010, it is part of the town Bad Dürrenberg, prior to that it was part of the Verwaltungsgemeinschaft Bad Dürrenberg.

Former municipalities in Saxony-Anhalt
Saalekreis